Brezoaele is a commune in Dâmbovița County, Muntenia, Romania. It is composed of two villages, Brezoaele and Brezoaia.

There are two primary schools and three kindergartens in Brezoaele.

References

Communes in Dâmbovița County
Localities in Muntenia